Glen is a hamlet in the Town of Glen in Montgomery County, New York, United States. It is located at the intersection of New York State Route 30A (NY 30A) and NY 161.

References

Geography of Montgomery County, New York
Hamlets in Montgomery County, New York